is a railway station in the city of Seki, Gifu Prefecture, Japan, operated by the third sector railway operator Nagaragawa Railway.

Lines

Station layout
Seki Station has two opposed ground-level side platforms connected by a level crossing. The station is staffed.

Platforms

Adjacent stations

|-
!colspan=5|Nagaragawa Railway

History
Operations were transferred from the Japan National Railway (JNR) to the Nagaragawa Railway on December 11, 1986, at which time the station was renamed to its present name.

Surrounding area
 Seki Cultural Center
 Seki Zenko-ji

See also
 List of Railway Stations in Japan

References

External links

 

Railway stations in Japan opened in 1923
Railway stations in Gifu Prefecture
Stations of Nagaragawa Railway
Seki, Gifu